There has been a wide range of films and TV series that have been shot in Winnipeg, Manitoba, Canada.

Television series

Children's series
2030 CE – Canadian TV series (2002)
The Adventures of Shirley Holmes (1996) – Canadian TV series
Fred Penner's Place (1985–1997) – Canadian TV series
Let's Go (1976–1987) – Canadian TV series
My Life as a Dog (1996) – Canadian TV series
Tipi Tales (2002) – Canadian TV series
Wawatay Kids TV (2002) – Canadian TV series
 400 Langside (2005–2006) – Canadian TV series
 I Am Weasel (1997–1999) — Canadian TV series
 Catscratch (2005–2007) — Canadian TV series
 Courage The Cowardly Dog (1999–2002) — Canadian TV series
 Rocko's Modern Life (1993–1996) — Canadian TV series
 The Ren and Stimpy Show (1991–1992) — Canadian TV series
 The Angry Beavers (1997–2001) — Canadian TV series
 CatDog (1998–2005) — Canadian TV series
 Camp Lazlo (2005–2007) — Canadian TV series
 My Gym Partner's a Monkey (2005–2007) — Canadian TV series
 Sheep in the Big City (2000–2002) — Canadian TV series
 2 Stupid Dogs (1993–1995) — Canadian TV series
 Cow and Chicken (1997–1999) — Canadian TV series
 Evil Con Carne (2003–2004) — Canadian TV series
 Foster's Home for Imaginary Friends (2004–2009) — Canadian TV series
 Aaahh!!! Real Monsters (1994–1997) — Canadian TV series
 T.U.F.F. Puppy 2010–2015 — Canadian TV series

Comedy series
Cashing In (2008, 2009)
Foodland (2010) – filmed on location
For Angela (1993) – dramatization of Rhonda Gordon's response to racism on a Winnipeg city bus
Heater (1999) – filmed on location
Keyhole (2011)
Leaving Metropolis (2002)
Less Than Kind (2008, 2009) – filmed on location
Mob Story (1990) – filmed on location
Niagara Motel (2006)
Night Mayor (2009) – filmed and set in Winnipeg
The Outside Chance of Maximilian Glick (1988)
Taken in Broad Daylight (2009) – filmed on location
Ted Baryluk's Grocery (1982) – National Film Board of Canada documentary
Twilight of the Ice Nymphs (1997) – filmed on location
The Saddest Music in the World (2003) – filmed on location
The Stone Angel (2007) – filmed on location
Stryker (2004) – filmed on location
Sunnyside (2014) – filmed on location
We Were Children (2012) – partially shot in Winnipeg
Zeyda and the Hitman (2004) – filmed on location

Documentary series
Country Canada (1955)
Magnificent Obsessions (2002–2003)
My Winnipeg – Guy Maddin documentary
The Sharing Circle (1991–2006)

Dramatic series
33 Brompton Place – TV miniseries
Falcon Beach (2006) – Canadian TV series
The Pinkertons (2014) – syndicated (Canada/USA) TV series
Siberia – filmed just outside Winnipeg in Birds Hill Provincial Park
Throwing Stones (2009) – Canadian TV series pilot
Tell Me You Love Me (2007) – American cable drama series

News and variety shows 
24Hours (1970–2000)
APTN National News (1999)
The Big Breakfast (1997–2005)
Breakfast Television (2005–2009)
Canadian Idol (2002–2007) – segments filmed in Winnipeg
Hymn Sing (1965–1995)
Reach for the Top (1966–1984) – location edition filmed in Winnipeg

Reality series
It's a Living (1999)
KinK (2002–2006)
Road Hockey Rumble (2007)

Films

Major studio films
49th Parallel (1941)
The Assassination of Jesse James by the Coward Robert Ford (2006)
Beethoven's Christmas Adventure (2011) – segments filmed in Transcona
The Big White 
Black Ice (1992)
Blue State (2007)
Capote (2005)
Christmas Rush (2002; also known as Breakaway) – TV movie; some scenes filmed in Winnipeg at Portage Place mall
The Clown at Midnight (1998)
The Constant Gardener (2005) – segments filmed in Winnipeg
Cult of Chucky (2017)
For Keeps? (1988) – segments filmed in Winnipeg
 Faces in the Crowd (2010)
Fractured (2019)
Full of It (2007)
The Good Life (2007)
Goon (2011)
The Haunting in Connecticut (2009)
Heaven is for Real (2014)
Horsemen (2009)
How It Ends (2018)
K-19: The Widowmaker (2002) – segments filmed in Winnipeg
Look Away (2018) 
The Lookout (2007)
New in Town (2009)
Nobody (2021)
One Last Dance (2003)
Radius (2017)
Shall We Dance (2004)
Siberia (2018) – segments filmed in Winnipeg.
Silence of the North (1981) – segments filmed in Winnipeg
Tamara (2005)
Violent Night (2022)
Whiteout (2009)
Wild Cherry (2009) – filmed in Winnipeg at Tec Voc High School
Wishmaster 3: Beyond the Gates of Hell (2001) – filmed in Winnipeg at University of Manitoba
Wishmaster: The Prophecy Fulfilled (2002)
Woman Wanted (2000)
 Orphan: First Kill (2022)

Independent films
88:88 (2015) – made by Isiah Medina
Aegri Somnia (2008) – written and directed by James Rewucki
Borealis (2015) – written and produced by Jonas Chernick, directed by Sean Garrity film
Clown at Midnight (1998) – writer Kenneth J. Hall; director Jean Pellerin
Cord (alternate title: Hide and Seek) (2000) – directed by Sidney J. Furie
Cowards Bend the Knee (2003) – Guy Maddin film
Crime Wave (1985) – written and directed by John Paizs
Hey, Happy! (2001) – Noam Gonick film
Hyena Road (2014) – Paul Gross film; partly filmed in Winnipeg
Perfect Sisters (2014) – directed by Stanley M. Brooks
Wait Till Helen Comes (2014) – Valérie d'Auteuil and André Rouleau film
You Kill Me (2007) – John Dahl film

TV movies of the week 
The Arrow (1997)
Behind the Camera: The Unauthorized Story of Three's Company (2003)
Category 6: Day of Destruction (2004)
Category 7: The End of the World (2005)
The Crooked E: The Unshredded Truth About Enron (2003)
Escape from Mars (1999)
Hell on Heels: The Battle of Mary Kay (2002)
Home Alone: The Holiday Heist (2012)
Inside the Osmonds (2001)
Keep Your Head Up, Kid: The Don Cherry Story (2010)
A Marriage of Convenience (1998)
Roswell: The Aliens Attack (1999)
A Season on the Brink (2002)
Secret Cutting (2000)
We Were the Mulvaneys (2002)

Special effects
Across the Universe (2007) – special effects
Alien Resurrection (1997) – special effects contributed to DVD release
Avatar (2009) – special effects
The Big Empty (2005) – special effects
Catwoman (2004) – special effects
The Chumscrubber (2005) – special effects
The Core (2003) – special effects
Cursed (2005) – special effects
Dragonball: Evolution (2009) – special effects
Duplicity (2009) – special effects 
Fantastic Four: Rise of the Silver Surfer (2007) – special effects
Firewall (2006) – special effects
G.I. Joe: The Rise of Cobra (2009) – special effects
Greatest Tank Battles (2011) – special effects & animation (S2 ep3, 7 & 8)
Grindhouse (2007) – special effects
Hangman's Curse (2003) – special effects
The Italian Job (2003) – special effects
Journey to the Center of the Earth (2008) – special effects
The Last Stand (2013) – special effects
Little Boy (2015) – special effects
Mr. Magorium’s Wonder Emporium (2007) – special effects
Paycheck (2003) – special effects
Poseidon (2006) – special effects
Resident Evil: Apocalypse (2004) – special effects
Scooby-Doo 2: Monsters Unleashed (2004) – special effects
Silent Hill (2006) – special effects
Silent Night (2012) – special effects
Sky Captain and the World of Tomorrow (2004) – special effects
Stay (2005) – special effects
Superman Returns (2006) – special effects
Swordfish (2001) – special effects
Tooth Fairy (2010) – special effects
The X-Files: I Want to Believe (2008) – special effects

Works famously not filmed in Winnipeg
The Office (US)
Parts of the eighth episode "Business Trip" from the fifth season were set in Winnipeg.
The NBC comedy is filmed in Los Angeles and due to their schedule/budget did not film scenes in Winnipeg. Though the series had shot scenes in New York City, they never left California for this episode. The episode did not call for any Winnipeg-specific locales. Los Angeles International Airport filled in for Winnipeg James Armstrong Richardson International Airport. A downtown hotel and bar in the Financial District were the other two settings. Characters Michael Scott, Oscar Martinez, and Andy Bernard visited Winnipeg in November. Michael was the only Dunder-Mifflin Regional Manager willing to visit Winnipeg in November. Andy was brought along mainly for being able to speak French, while Oscar is an accountant. They were there on a sales call to sell paper. While in Winnipeg, Oscar and Andy get drunk at a bar and become friends after limited interactions back at the office. Michael, with some help from Andy, hooks up with the hotel concierge at a bar. They go back to her room at the hotel. After having sex, Michael is kicked out of the room. The next day the three go to the sales meeting and secure the client for two years. However, Michael did not enjoy this stay in Winnipeg as it was not the "international" location he envisioned it to be and was still upset about his girlfriend being transferred in an earlier episode.

Destination Winnipeg sent the show Winnipeg items such as Old Dutch chips and Fort Garry Brewing Company beer bottles. The budget also limited the amount of fake snow used in the episode. Writer Brent Forrester explained in a CBC News interview that, "It seemed like Montreal was maybe too exotic and Vancouver also a little maybe too conventionally sexy, and Winnipeg seemed to strike the right balance between exotic and obscure." Surprisingly, there was only one brief joke at the expense of Winnipeg, about traveling there in November. Canadian writer Anthony Farrell ensured the script was not filled with Canadian stereotypes.

The Simpsons
For the show’s 16th season, parts of the sixth episode, "Midnight Rx," took place in Winnipeg. The episode dealt with Homer Simpson and his dad traveling to Winnipeg to obtain cheap prescription drugs and smuggle them into the States. They become heroes back in Springfield, USA when they brought the cheap prescription drugs. Ned Flanders and Apu Nahasapeemapetilon later join the Simpson men on another trip to Winnipeg. Ned encounters a Winnipegger who talks and looks just like he does. Ned was upset to find out his Canadian counterpart was smoking medical marijuana, called a "reeferino." The four then drive to the Manitoba/North Dakota border crossing where their drug smuggling is discovered.

Instead of "Welcome to Winnipeg: One Great City!" the Simpsons drove by "We Were Born Here, What's Your Excuse" on the welcome sign.
Legends of the Fall (1994)
The film's producers wanted to use Winnipeg's Exchange District, renowned for its wealth of turn of the century-era warehouses and office buildings, for scenes taking place in Helena, Montana. This plan was scuttled when several residents, and later city government, objected to the film crew's desire to remove several dozen trees growing along the sidewalks. Although TriStar offered to replant and/or replace the trees after wrapping, they were rebuffed.

Notes

 
 
TV and films
Winnipeg